Peptidyl-prolyl cis-trans isomerase H is an enzyme that in humans is encoded by the PPIH gene.

The protein encoded by this gene is a member of the peptidyl-prolyl cis-trans isomerase (PPIase) family. PPIases catalyze the cis-trans isomerization of proline imidic peptide bonds in oligopeptides and accelerate the folding of proteins. This protein is a specific component of the complex that includes pre-mRNA processing factors PRPF3, PRPF4, and PRPF18, as well as U4/U5/U6 tri-snRNP. This protein has been shown to possess PPIase activity and may act as a protein chaperone that mediates the interactions between different proteins inside the spliceosome.

References

Further reading